George Stoupe (born 15 June 2001) is a New Zealand tennis player.

Stoupe has a career high ITF junior combined ranking of 219 achieved on 15 April 2019. He is considered as one of the next top players from New Zealand following the retirement of Marina Erakovic.

Stoupe made his ATP main draw debut at the 2019 ASB Classic in the doubles draw partnering Ajeet Rai.

ATP Challenger and ITF World Tennis Tour finals

Singles: 0 (0–0)

Doubles 1 (0–1)

References

External links
 
 

2001 births
Living people
New Zealand male tennis players